Peter Tasker Sowden (1 May 1929 – 12 November 2010) was an English professional footballer. His clubs included Aldershot,  Accrington Stanley, Wrexham and Gillingham, where he made over 130 Football League appearances.

He also played for Chorley, Great Harwood and Mossley.

References

1929 births
2010 deaths
English footballers
Blackpool F.C. players
Bacup Borough F.C. players
Hull City A.F.C. players
Elgin City F.C. players
Aldershot F.C. players
Gillingham F.C. players
Accrington Stanley F.C. (1891) players
Wrexham A.F.C. players
Chorley F.C. players
Footballers from Bradford
Association football inside forwards
English Football League players
Mossley A.F.C. players